Hewitsonia occidentalis, the western tiger blue, is a butterfly in the family Lycaenidae. It is found in Guinea, Ivory Coast, Ghana and western Nigeria. The habitat consists of forests.

References

Butterflies described in 1997
Poritiinae